Gavin Victor (born 11 August 1966) is a South African cricketer. He played in 57 first-class and 78 List A matches from 1987/88 to 1997/98.

References

External links
 

1966 births
Living people
South African cricketers
Border cricketers
Eastern Province cricketers
Free State cricketers
Cricketers from Port Elizabeth